Guttera is a genus of birds in the family Numididae. Established by Johann Georg Wagler in 1832, it contains two species:
 Plumed guineafowl, Guttera plumifera
 Eastern crested guineafowl, Guttera pucherani
 Western crested guineafowl, Guttera verreauxi
 Southern crested guineafowl, Guttera edouardi

The name Guttera is a combination of the Latin words gutta, meaning "spot" and -fera, meaning "bearing" (from ferre: to bear).

The four species are found in forests of sub-Saharan Africa. Unlike other guineafowl, they have a distinctive black crest.

References

 
Bird genera